This  gauge railroad was first chartered as the Memphis Branch Railroad and Steamboat Company of Georgia in 1839. This company built a  line between Rome, Georgia and Kingston where it connected with the Western and Atlantic Railroad. The name was changed to the Rome Railroad in 1850.

In spite of this, the railroad was often referred to as the Rome and Kingston Railroad in both the 1860 Census and during the Civil War. 
This railroad was acquired by the Nashville, Chattanooga and St. Louis Railway in 1896 who finally abandoned it in 1943.

Notable people
 Eben Hillyer (1832-1910), physician; president, Rome Railroad

References

Defunct Georgia (U.S. state) railroads
Predecessors of the Nashville, Chattanooga and St. Louis Railway
Railway companies established in 1850
Railway companies disestablished in 1896
5 ft gauge railways in the United States